Lam Yi Young  (born 1972) is the Chief Executive Officer of the Singapore Business Federation (SBF) and former Senior Civil Servant. He is also the former Chief Executive of the Maritime and Port Authority of Singapore (MPA).

Education 
Lam studied at Victoria Junior College as part of the cohort of 1989.

He then studied at the University of Cambridge from 1991–1994 and graduated with a Bachelor of Arts (Honours) degree in Engineering, now holding a Master of Arts (Cambridge) in Engineering.

Lam later studied at the John F. Kennedy School of Government at Harvard University from 2004–2005 and graduated with a Master of Public Administration.

Career

Civil Service 
Lam spent 24 years in the Singapore Civil Service from 1996–2020 and served various positions in the Ministry of Defence, the Ministry of Finance, the Ministry of Education (MOE), the MPA and the Ministry of Trade and Industry (MTI). This included 11 years in Senior Public Sector Leadership positions from 2009–2020, including as Chief Executive of the MPA, Deputy Secretary (Policy) in the MOE, as well as Deputy Secretary (Future Economy) and later Deputy Secretary (Industry) in the MTI.

MPA 

Lam served as Chief Executive of the Maritime and Port Authority of Singapore from May 2009–December 2013.

During his tenure at MPA, Lam was involved in the commissioning of the new Port Operations Control Centre (POCC) at Changi Naval Base and the decommissioning of the POCC at Tanjong Pagar Complex. Lam was also involved in the formation of various maritime initiatives related to education and decreasing environmental impacts of shipping, including witnessing signings of the Singapore Maritime Green Pledge which was first launched in 2011. He was involved in the formation of the Singapore Maritime Institute and the opening of the Singapore Maritime Gallery in 2012. He also signed Memorandums of Understanding to launch and support various educational and research and development programmes in the fields of maritime and clean energy.

Lam held his keynote address Towards a Sustainable Maritime Singapore at the World Maritime Day Symposium in 2013 on Singapore's approach to, experience with, and commitment to, sustainable maritime development.

SBF 
On 1 January 2021, Lam succeeded Ho Meng Kit to become the CEO of SBF. He previously served as the deputy CEO after joining SBF in July 2020.

Other 
Lam is the vice-president of the Global Compact Network Singapore and a board member of the Accounting and Corporate Regulatory Authority.

Honours
 :
  Pingat Pentadbiran Awam (Perak) - PPA(P) (Public Administration Medal (Silver)) (2015)
  Pingat Bakti Setia - PBS (Long Service Medal) (2019)

References

Alumni of the University of Cambridge
Harvard Kennedy School alumni
Living people
Recipients of the Pingat Bakti Setia
Recipients of the Pingat Pentadbiran Awam
Singaporean chief executives
Singaporean people of Hakka descent
Singapore Business Federation
Victoria Junior College alumni
1972 births